Sonja Lang (previously known as Sonja Elen Kisa,  1978) is a Canadian linguist and translator. She is best known for her creation of Toki Pona, a minimalist constructed language.

Biography 
Lang was born and raised in Moncton, New Brunswick. She grew up in a bilingual family; her mother spoke French, and her father spoke English. During and after her high school years, she became fluent in five languages, including Esperanto. She later said that Esperanto was the inspiration for her creation of constructed languages.

Lang worked for a communications agency for a few years, providing translation and media services. Lang also taught French at a community college. In addition, Lang worked in cybersecurity. Lang also worked for the Council of Europe as an interpreter.

She currently lives in Toronto.

Creation of Toki Pona 

In 2001, Lang was experiencing depression and as a way to simplify her thoughts, Lang developed Toki Pona, an oligoisolating constructed language. Lang stated that the language, which has only 120 words, would encourage people to think through things and would encourage more positive statements, in accordance with the Sapir–Whorf hypothesis. Toki Pona was also partly inspired by Taoist philosophy. An early version of Toki Pona was published by Lang in 2001, and it quickly gained some popularity. In 2014, Lang released a book on the language, Toki Pona: The Language of Good, followed by a French edition in 2016 and a German edition in 2021.

In 2021, Lang published a second book on Toki Pona, Toki Pona Dictionary which includes additional words invented by the Toki Pona community.

References

External links 
 Lang's personal website
 Toki Pona's official website

1978 births
Living people
Linguists from Canada
Canadian translators
Women linguists
Constructed language creators
Writers from Moncton
Academics from New Brunswick